Charles Trumbull Granger (October 9, 1835October 26, 1915) was an American lawyer and pioneer settler of Allamakee County, Iowa.  He was a justice of the Iowa Supreme Court, serving from 1889 through 1900.  He previously served on lower courts in Iowa, serving a total of 28 years in various judicial offices.

Biography
Charles T. Granger was born in Monroe County, New York, in October 1835.  At age 2, he moved with his family to Huron County, Ohio.  He was raised there, but after the death of his mother in 1845, he fell mostly under the care of his older sister and her husband.  He was poorly treated in their home and left Ohio at age 13, going to live with his father in Illinois, who had remarried.  After being only minimally educated in Ohio, he began studying while working on his father's farm.  In 1855, he entered an academy in Waukegan, Illinois, and continued to advance his own education by reading law texts borrowed from nearby lawyers.

In 1860, he moved to Allamakee County, Iowa, and read law at the office of Hatch & Wilbur.  Later that year he was admitted to the bar.  Before starting his career, he went to Mitchell County, Iowa, to teach school, and was elected county superintendent of schools.  Less than a year later, however, he resigned his office in order to enroll in the Union Army.  He was commissioned captain of Company K, 27th Iowa Infantry Regiment, and served through the rest of the war commanding his company.

After the war, he returned briefly to Mitchell County, but before long returned to Allamakee County to form a law practice in partnership with his former mentor, L. O. Hatch.

Three years later, he was appointed district attorney to fill a vacancy.  He was subsequently elected to a four-year term in that office in 1870, but before that term ended, he was elected Iowa circuit court judge.  During that time, in 1874, he was the Republican nominee for United States House of Representatives in Iowa's 3rd congressional district, but was defeated by Lucien Lester Ainsworth.

Granger ultimately served as a circuit judge until the Iowa circuit courts were abolished in 1886.  He then was elected Iowa district court judge for the 13th district alongside his former law partner, L. O. Hatch.

Just two years later, he was elected to a six year term on the Iowa Supreme Court.  He was re-elected in 1894.  He retired at the end of his second term.

He continued to make Waukon his primary home, but spent a great deal of time in California for his health.  He died of pneumonia at Long Beach, California, in October 1915.

Personal life and family

Charles Granger was the youngest son of Trumbull Granger and his first wife Sally ( Dibble).  Granger's first cousin Jedediah W. Granger was also an officer in the 27th Wisconsin Infantry.  Union Army general Gordon Granger was a second cousin.  The Grangers were descendants of Launcelot Granger, who was kidnapped as a child from England and brought to the Massachusetts Bay Colony as an indentured servant in the 1640s.

Elections

U.S. House of Representatives (1874)

Iowa Supreme Court (1888, 1894)

| colspan="6" style="text-align:center;background-color: #e9e9e9;"| General Election, November 6, 1888 
 

| colspan="6" style="text-align:center;background-color: #e9e9e9;"| General Election, November 6, 1894

References

External links

|-

1835 births
1915 deaths
People from Monroe County, New York
People from Huron County, Ohio
People from Waukegan, Illinois
People from Allamakee County, Iowa
People from Mitchell County, Iowa
Justices of the Iowa Supreme Court
People of Iowa in the American Civil War
Union Army officers